Erie is a small unincorporated community in Pennington County, Minnesota, United States. The community was home to local businesses until the late 20th century with the closing of its last store, Sjulstad Store.

A post office called Erie was established in 1905, and remained in operation until 1938. The community was named after Erie, Pennsylvania.

References

Unincorporated communities in Pennington County, Minnesota
Unincorporated communities in Minnesota